The Queen Elizabeth II Bridge is a bridge in Belfast, Northern Ireland. It was built in the 1960s.

History
In 1966 Queen Elizabeth II and Prince Philip opened the "Queen Elizabeth II bridge". Within Belfast City Council there had been disputes over the name of the new bridge, which they had originally wanted to be called "Carson's Bridge". During the visit, a bottle was thrown at the car the Royals were riding in, and a brick dropped onto it.

See also
List of bridges over the River Lagan

References

Bridges in Northern Ireland
Buildings and structures in Belfast